Mulantou Lighthouse, also known as the Hainan Head Light, located in the province of Hainan, China, is the fifth-tallest lighthouse in the world, and the tallest in China.

It emits two white flashes every 15 seconds.

It is located on a sharp promontory at the northeastern tip of the province, and marks the south side of the entrance to Qiongzhou Strait.

The structure is round cylindrical concrete rising from a 2-story circular base. It has a large circular observation room. This lighthouse is white in colour with red trim.

See also

 List of lighthouses in China
List of tallest lighthouses in the world
 Baishamen Lighthouse – the second tallest lighthouse in China

References

  Listed as Mulan Tou.

External links

Information of Mulantou Lighthouse

Lighthouses completed in 1995
Lighthouses in China
Buildings and structures in Hainan
1995 establishments in China